Federica Piovano (born 14 October 1981) is a professional golfer from Italy. She played on the Ladies European Tour 2004–2011 and won the 2005 Austrian Ladies Open.

Career
As an amateur, Piovano represented Europe at the 1997 Junior Ryder Cup and represented the Continent of Europe at the Vagliano Trophy in 1999 and 2001. She was runner-up at the 1998 Espirito Santo Trophy in Chile with Sophie Sandolo and Giulia Sergas, and won the 2000 European Lady Junior's Team Championship.

Piovano turned professional in 2003 after finishing 17th at the Ladies European Tour Qualifying School. She won her only event on the Ladies European Tour in 2005 at the Siemens Austrian Ladies Open, beating Gwladys Nocera by one stroke.

Piovano withdrew with a wrist injury after eight holes during the first round of the 2011 Sicilian Ladies Italian Open and retired from tour, one week before turning 30, planning to continuing to work as a coach at Parco di Roma.

Professional wins (1)

Ladies European Tour wins (1)

Team appearances
Amateur
Junior Ryder Cup (representing Europe): 1997
Espirito Santo Trophy (representing Italy): 1998
European Ladies' Team Championship (representing Italy): 1999, 2001
Vagliano Trophy (representing the Continent of Europe): 1999 (winners), 2001 (winners)
European Lady Junior's Team Championship (representing Italy): 2000 (winners)

References

External links

Italian female golfers
Ladies European Tour golfers
Sportspeople from Rome
1981 births
Living people